Dasharath Rangasala is a multi-purpose stadium in Tripureshwar, Kathmandu. It is named after Dasharath Chand, one of the four great martyrs of Nepal.

The stadium is used mostly for football matches and cultural programmes. It has floodlights installed, to facilitate matches and events in the evenings. Most of Nepal's national and international tournaments are held in this stadium. Nepal's primary football division, Martyr's Memorial League, is also held on this ground every year. The stadium has also been the only host of the inaugural 2021 Nepal Super League season.

History

The stadium was built in 1956. It was renovated in 1998 to host the 1999 South Asian Games. In 2011, it was renovated again to host the 2012 AFC Challenge Cup.

As Nepal's biggest stadium, the stadium has hosted many important events. The 2012 AFC Challenge Cup and the 2013 SAFF Championship were held here, with the Halchowk Stadium hosting some of the matches as well. Numerous cultural festivals and musical events took place here as well. The 2011 concert of Bryan Adams was held in this stadium and was his first rock concert in Nepal.

The stadium suffered damage from the April 2015 earthquake that hit Nepal.

After the earthquake, the stadium was renovated for the third time and the opening was done again on 1 December 2019 for the 2019 South Asian Games.

Major catastrophe

On 13 March 1988, about 30,000 people were present in the stadium to watch a match between two clubs from Nepal and Bangladesh when a hailstorm broke out, causing a stampede as the supporters tried to escape the stadium. According to reports, about 93 people died in the stampede, including two police officers and a 12-year-old child. More than 100 people were hospitalised with injuries. It was considered one of the worst catastrophic events in the history of sports.

Major sports events
 1997 SAFF Football Championship (4 – 13 September 1997)
 1999 South Asian Games
 2012 AFC Challenge Cup (8 – 19 March 2012)
 2013 SAFF U-16 Championship (20 – 30 July 2013)
 2013 SAFF Championship (31 August – 11 September 2013)
 2019 South Asian Games (1 – 10 December 2019)
 2022 SAFF Women's Championship (6 - 19 September 2022)

Major music and cultural events
 Bryan Adams – live in concert by JPR events (19 February 2011)
 Atif Aslam – live in concert (2013)

See also
All Nepal Football Association
Nepal national football team
Nepal women's national football team
Nepal national under-17 football team
Nepal national under-20 football team
Nepal Super League
List of football stadiums in Nepal

References

Football venues in Nepal
Athletics (track and field) venues in Nepal
Multi-purpose stadiums in Nepal
Sports venues in Kathmandu
Sports venues completed in 1956
1956 establishments in Nepal
Taekwondo venues